Cornelius Lupus was a Roman senator active during the Principate.  The offices Lupus held included Proconsul of Creta et Cyrenaica during the reign of Emperor Tiberius, and most significantly suffect consul for an unknown number of months in AD 42 as the colleague of Gaius Caecina Largus.

Despite being a friend of the emperor Claudius, Lupus was one of the victims of the notorious delator or informer Publius Suillius Rufus, whose prosecution destroyed Lupus.

References

Year of birth unknown
Year of death unknown
1st-century Romans
Suffect consuls of Imperial Rome
Roman governors of Crete and Cyrenaica